First Sensibility is the first studio album by the South Korean male pop group B.A.P.  It was released on February 3, 2014 under the label of TS Entertainment. It features the single "1004 (Angel)".

Track listing

Promotion
The first 30 seconds teaser clip for the music video of the title track 1004 (Angel) was released on January 22, 2014. On January 26, B.A.P released their album medley and pre-released additional 30 seconds preview on Naver Music. The full version video was released on February 2, 2014 through YouTube.

On February 7, B.A.P made their first live broadcast appearance promoting the album on Music Bank. This was followed by appearance for Bang X2 and 1004 (Angel) on Music Core on February 8.

External links
First Sensibility on iTunes

2014 albums
B.A.P (South Korean band) albums
Kakao M albums
TS Entertainment albums